Gohar and Gauhar are given names and surnames. Gawhar is a given name. Bearers of the name include:

Given name

Gohar
Gohar Ali Shah, Pakistani politician from Mardan District, member of the Khyber Pakhtunkhwa Assembly
Gohar Dashti (born 1980), Iranian photographer and video artist
Gohar Faiz (born 1986), Pakistani cricketer 
Gohar Gasparyan (1924–2007), Armenian opera singer
Gohar Gasparyan (television presenter), Armenian television presenter
Gohar Ayub Khan, Pakistani politician
Gohar Kheirandish, Iranian actress
Gohar Markosjan-Käsper (1949–2015), Armenian-Estonian writer 
Gohar Mamajiwala (1910–1985), Indian singer, actress, producer and studio owner
Gohar Muradyan, Armenian philologist and translator
Gohar Nabil (born 1973), Egyptian handball player
Gohar Rasheed (born 1984), Pakistani actor
Gohar Shah (born 1995), Pakistani cricketer
Gohar Zaman (born 1979), Pakistani footballer

Gauhar
 Gauhar Ara Begum (1631–c. 1706), Mughal princess, daughter of Shah Jahan and Mumtaz Mahal
 Gauhar Afroz (born 1965), also known as Gori, Pakistani retired film actress
 Gauhar Ali (born 1989), Pakistani cricketer
 Gauhar Hafeez (born 1999), Pakistani cricketer
 Gauhar Jaan (1873–1930), Indian singer and dancer
 Gauhar Jamil (c. 1925–1980), Bangladeshi dancer born Ganesh Nath
 Gauhar Raza (born 1956), Indian poet, social activist and documentary filmmaker
 Gauhar Rehman (1936–2003), Pakistani Islamic scholar and politician

Gawhar
 Gawhar (died between 1892 and 1921), third wife of Baháʼu'lláh, founder of the Baháʼí Faith religion
 Hajji Gawhar Khanum, first female poet and astronomer of the 19th-century Qajar empire
 Gawhar Shad (died 1457), chief consort of Shah Rukh, ruler of the Timurid Empire

Surname

Gohar
 Ali Gohar, birth name of Shah Alam II (1728–1806), Mughal emperor
 Ali Gohar, Pakistani scholar and restorative justice expert, founder and executive director of Just Peace Initiatives (formerly Just Peace International)
 Bushra Gohar, Pakistani politician and Pashtun human rights activist
 Hamed Gohar, Egyptian oceanographer and biologist
 Nouran Gohar (born 1997), Egyptian squash player

Gauhar
 Altaf Gauhar (1923–2000), Pakistani civil servant, journalist, poet, and writer very close to the country’s first military dictator, Ayub Khan 
 Madeeha Gauhar (1956–2018), Pakistani actress, playwright and director of social theater, and women's rights activist
 Ranjana Gauhar, Indian classical dancer

See also
 Jauhar, an act of mass self-immolation by women in parts of the Indian subcontinent
 Jawhar (disambiguation)
 Gauahar Khan (born 1983), Indian model and actress